The Poor Rich is a 1934 American pre-Code comedy film directed by Edward Sedgwick and written by Ebba Havez and Dale Van Every. The film stars Edward Everett Horton, Edna May Oliver, Andy Devine, Leila Hyams, Grant Mitchell and Thelma Todd. The film was released on February 26, 1934, by Universal Pictures.

Plot
A once wealthy American dynasty, the Spottiswoods, envision their financial salvation in marrying into money via an upcoming visit from the British (and actually wealthy) Fetherstones. To play the part, the Spottiswoods must quickly rehabilitate their estate to have a veneer of class and enlist a cadre of quirky workers to act as their domestic servants. Hijinks ensue.

Cast 
Edward Everett Horton as Albert Stuyvesant Spottiswood
Edna May Oliver as Harriet Spottiswood
Andy Devine as Andy
Leila Hyams as Grace Hunter
Grant Mitchell as Tom Hopkins
Thelma Todd as Gwendolyn Fetherstone
Una O'Connor as Lady Fetherstone
E. E. Clive as Lord Fetherstone
John Miljan as Prince Abdul Hamidshan
Sidney Bracey as Arbuthnot
Jack Rube Clifford as Station Agent
Henry Armetta as Tony
Ward Bond as Motor Cop

References

External links
 

1934 films
1930s English-language films
American comedy films
1934 comedy films
Universal Pictures films
Films directed by Edward Sedgwick
American black-and-white films
1930s American films